Pendembu is a town in Kailahun District in the Eastern Province of Sierra Leone. The town population was 7,243 at the 2004 census but increased to 20,502 according to a more recent estimate. Pendembu lies approximately 36 miles from Kenema and about 235 east of Freetown. Pendembu is a trade center and is one of the main towns in Eastern Sierra Leone.

The vast majority of Pendembu's population are from the Mende ethnic group. As with most parts of Sierra Leone, the Krio language of the Sierra Leone Creole people is by far the most widely spoken language in Pendembu and is the primary means of communication in the city. The most widely spoken languages are Mende and Krio. The town is the birthplace of former President of Sierra Leone Ahmad Tejan Kabbah.

A health clinic south of Pendembu is operated by the Handmaids of the Holy Child Jesus religious order.

Namesakes 
There are a number of other towns with similar names.

References 

Populated places in Sierra Leone
Eastern Province, Sierra Leone